Telluria mixta (formerly called Pseudomonas mixta) is a species of Gram-negative soil bacteria that actively degrades polysaccharides including dextran, inulin, pectate, starch, and xylan.  The bacterium is straight-rod-shaped, 0.5 to 1.0 μm wide and usually 2 to 3 μm long, and can grow both lateral and polar flagella.  Optimal growth is seen between 30 and 35 °C, at a neutral pH, and with no salt present.  Growth is totally inhibited in a sodium chloride concentration of 1.5% or more.  A high level of nitrogenous carbon also inhibits growth.

The name generic name Telluria, meaning "from the earth", derives from Tellus, the Roman earth goddess.

References

International Journal of Systematic Bacteriology, January 1993, pages 120-124

External links
Type strain of Telluria mixta at BacDive -  the Bacterial Diversity Metadatabase

Burkholderiales
Bacteria described in 1989